This is a list of women photographers who were born in Australia or whose works are closely associated with that country.

A

 Narelle Autio (born 1969), photojournalist working first in Europe and the USA before returning to Australia in 1998 as staff photographer for the Sydney Morning Herald<ref>Trent Parke and Narelle Autio, The Seventh Wave, Kirribilli, NSW: Hot Chilli Press, 2000; Michael Fitzgerald, Narelle Autio and Trent Parke: 'To the sea', Photofile, No. 93, spring / Summer 2013: 56-61.''</ref>

B
 Sarah Bahbah, photographic artist, with large Instagram following
 Euphemia Eleanor Baker (aka Effie Baker) (1880–1968), photographer of Australian wildflowers and Bahá'í Faith
 Polly Borland (born 1959), now living in England, known both for her portraits of famous Australians and for several series of stylized portraits
 Pat Brassington (born 1942), Tasmanian photographer and digital artist.
 Kate Breakey (born 1957), visual artist creating large-scale, hand-colored photographs.
 Harriett Brims (1864–1939), pioneer commercial photographer in Queensland
 Amelia Bunbury (1863–1958), photographer from Western Australia, works published in the Western Mail Jane Burton (born 1966), Melbourne-based photographer.

C
 Emily Florence Cazneau (1855–1892), mother of Harold, see List of New Zealand women photographers
 Alex Cearns, animal photography
 Sarah Chinnery (1887–1970), photographer and diarist
 Pegg Clarke (c.1890–1959), fashion, portrait, architectural and society photographer
 Suzanna Clarke (born 1961), see List of New Zealand women photographers
 Beverley Clifford (fl 1950s), magazine photographer and photojournalist
 Olive Cotton (1911–2003), modernist photographer working in the 1930s and 1940s in Sydney, receiving commissions from the publisher Sidney Ure Smith
 Virginia Coventry (born 1942), photographer of environmental protests
 Brenda L Croft (born 1964), First Nations artist, writer and curator drawing on familial and public archives to explore Indigenous histories and experiences

D
 Destiny Deacon (born 1957), Queensland photographer of indigenous culture
 Lillian Dean (c.1899–1980), Northern Territory photographer and local politician
 Maggie Diaz (1925–2016), American-born photographer, noted for her 1950s Chicago Collection
 Rozalind Drummond (born 1956), postmodernism photographic artist

E
 Sandy Edwards (born 1948), documentary photographer and curator of photography, known for personal approach to documentary
 Mireille Eid (Astore) (born 1961), Lebanese-born artist and photographer
 Odette England (born 1975)
 Joyce Evans (1929–2019), opened the first commercial photo gallery in Melbourne, later working herself in portraiture and landscapes, taught history of photography
 Samantha Everton, is a contemporary photographic artist

F
 Anne Ferran (born 1949), photographic artist
 Sue Ford (1943–2009), celebrated photographer of social life, known for her personal approach to her subjects

G
 Anne Geddes (born 1956), stylized photographs of babies published in book-form or calendars
 Juno Gemes (born 1944), Hungarian-Australian known for photography of aboriginals
 Heather George (1907–1983), commercial industrial, fashion and outback photographer and painter
 Kate Geraghty (born 1972), photojournalist for the Sydney Morning Herald, covered the 2002 Bali bombings and 2003 invasion of Iraq

H
 Liz Ham (born 1975), Sydney-based photographer of urban life, fashion, music and politics, also known for book Punk Girls C. Moore Hardy (born 1955), Sydney-based photographer, documenting the Sydney queer community since the late 1970s
Ponch Hawkes (born 1946), Melbourne-based photographer
Merris Hillard (born 1949), printmaker and photographer
 Ruth Hollick (1883–1977), Melbourne-based portrait and fashion photographer
 Louisa Elizabeth How (1821–1893), early woman photographer

J
 Carol Jerrems (1949–1980), explored issues of sexuality, youth, identity and mortality

K
 Bronwyn Kidd (born 1969), fashion, magazine and portrait photographer
 Katrin Koenning (born 1978), German-Australian photographer, photojournalist and videographer

L
 Leah King-Smith, photographer and digital media artist
 Pamela Lofts, book illustrator, photographer, and artist

M
 Ruth Maddison (born 1945), explores themes of relationships, communities and families
Elsie Rosaline Masson (1890–1935), photographer, writer and traveller
Barbara McGrady (born 1950), indigenous photographer
Louisa Anne Meredith (1812–1895), writer and early photographer
 Margaret Michaelis-Sachs (1902–1985), see Poland
 Alice Mills (1870–1929), successful photographer in Melbourne
 Jacqueline Mitelman (born 1968), portrait photographer
 Tracey Moffatt (born 1960), explores issues of sexuality, history, representation and race 
 May and Mina Moore (May 1881–1931; Mina 1882–1957), New Zealand-born portrait photographers
 Hedda Morrison (1908–1991), see Germany

N
 June Newton (1923–2021), photographs under the pseudonym Alice Springs

P 
 Polixeni Papapetrou (1960–2018), noted for her themed photo series about people's identities
 Lillian Louisa Pitts (1872–1947), music teacher and professional photographer

R
 Jacky Redgate (born 1955), sculptor, installation artist and photographer
 Leonie Reisberg (born 1955), photographer and lecturer in photography

S
 Rebecca Shanahan, NSW-based artist and photographer
 Rose Simmonds (1877–1960), British-born Queensland photographer and member of the Pictorialism movement
 Alexia Sinclair (born 1976), fine-art photographer
 Ruby Spowart (born 1928), photographs of the Australian outback in the 1980s and 1990s
 Robyn Stacey (born 1952), camera obscura photographs, evocative still life using historical collections

Z
 Anne Zahalka (born 1957), photographer

See also
List of women photographers

References

Bibliography
 Ennis, Helen. "1970s Photographic Practice: A Homogenous View?" Photofile 4, no. 1 (Autumn 1986): 12-15.
 Hall, Barbara and Jenni Mather. Australian Women Photographers: 1840-1960. Richmond: Greenhouse, 1986.
 Moore, Catriona. Indecent Exposures: Twenty Years of Australian Feminist Photography. St Leonards: Allen & Unwin, 1994.
 Newton, Gael. “The Movement of Women.” Art and Australia'' 33, no. 1 (Spring 1995): 62–9.

-
Australian women photographers, List of
Photographers
Photographers